Wythenshawe FM 97.2, also known as WFM, is a community radio station broadcasting primarily to Wythenshawe, Manchester and the surrounding south Manchester area. It was one of the first radio stations of its type in the UK, gaining a full-time licence in 2005 and is run entirely by volunteers.

Aims

It's mission is to:

• promote local services and community groups.

• raise awareness of issues which affect local communities.

• give people in the area the chance to learn social skills and gain qualifications in radio presentation /production, leading to better chances of employability, regardless of experience.

• promote equality and bring people together – regardless of age, race, gender, sexual orientation or religious beliefs.

History

A partnership between Radio Regen, WFM and Manchester College of Arts and Technology (MANCAT) has given students the chance to gaim work experience at the station.

Its sister station, All FM, serves the Ardwick, Longsight and Levenshulme areas of Manchester.

In 2010, Wythenshawe FM became independent after 10 years of support and management under Radio Regen. WFM Community Media, a new company and charity overseeing the operation of Wythenshawe FM was established, now entirely volunteer led. 

In 2014 Wythenshawe FM earned the Queen’s Award for Voluntary Service, the highest award for volunteers and the equivalent of an MBE!

In November 2017 they were awarded the runner-up trophy for a Be Proud Award as Voluntary Group of the Year.

In 2021, the station breached the conditions of its OFCOM license by failing to submit its financial reports on time.

References

External links
 

Radio stations in Manchester
Community radio stations in the United Kingdom